Galip is the Turkish spelling of the Arabic masculine given name Ghalib (Arabic: غالب ghālib) which generally means "to overcome, to defeat", also meaning "successor, victor". 

It may refer to:

People
 Galip Balkar (1936–1983), Turkish diplomat assassinated by Armenian militants
 Galip Cav (1912–?), Turkish cyclist and participant in the 1928 Summer Olympics
 Galip Ramadhi (born 1950), Albanian politician
 Mehmed Said Galip Pasha (1764–1829), Ottoman grand vizier
 Reşit Galip (1893–1934), Turkish politician

See also
 Galip nut
 Galatasaray Beyoğlu Hasnun Galip Club Administrative Center

Turkish masculine given names